Pesme iznad istoka i zapada (trans. Songs above East and West) is an album comprising the works of various artists, released in 2001, featuring thirteen songs recorded by Serbian rock musicians based on the poems of Bishop Nikolaj Velimirović (who has been canonized since the release of the album).

In 2021 Pesme iznad istoka i zapada was polled 69th on the list of 100 Best Serbian Albums Since the Breakup of SFR Yugoslavia. The list was published in the book Kako (ni)je propao rokenrol u Srbiji (How Rock 'n' Roll in Serbia (Didn't) Came to an End).

Recording and release
The album features (at the time) current and former members of Bezobrazno Zeleno, Bjesovi, Galija, Darkwood Dub, Luna, La Strada, Partibrejkers, Plejboj, Hazari, Sunshine, Električni Orgazam, 357, Qrve, Džukele, Goblini, Night Shift, Ana Stanić's backing band, and other bands. The album also features Goran Trajkovski, member of Macedonian band Anastasia. Although the participation of former Idoli members Srđan Šaper and Nebojša Krstić was announced, the two did not participate in the album recording.

The album was edited by hieromonk Jovan Ćulibrk. The album was officially released on Easter, April 15, 2001, through PGP-RTS, in cooperation with Radio Svetigora, the radio of the Serbian Orthodox Church.

Track listing

Personnel
Dragutin Aleksandrić (Qrve) - guitar
Nebojša Antonijević (Partibrejkers) - guitar
Julija Boroš - vocals
Zoran Cvetković (357) - trumpet
Nebojša Čanković (357) - guitar
Dragan Ćurković (Revolt) - guitar
Marko Dacić (357, Night Shift) - bass guitar
Aleksandar Gardašević (DST) - vocals
Nikola Hadži-Nikolić (357) - vocals
Dragutin Jakovljević (Galija, Ana Stanić backing band) - guitar
Vladimrir Jerić (Darkwood Dub) - guitar
Igor Kašiković (Revolt) - bass guitar
Ivan Kljajić (Bezobrazno Zeleno, Ana Stanić backing band) - guitar, producer, mixing
Zoran Kostić (Partibrejkers) - vocals
Draško Kremenović (Revolt) - vocals
Olivera Kristić - backing vocals
Boris Lješković (DST) - vocals
Zoran Maksimović (Jazz Ba) - guitar
Goran Marić (Bjesovi) - vocals, backing vocals
Goran Milošević (Hazari) - percussion
Goran Milošević (Plejboj, Ana Stanić backing band) - drums
Jasmina Mitrušić (Luna, La Strada) - vocals
Đorđe Petrović (DJ) - scratch
Leonid Pilipović (Džukele, Goblini) - guitar
Ognjen Popović (Jazz Ba, Ana Stanić backing band) - bass guitar
Nebojša Potkonjak (357) - trumpet
Manja Ristić - violin
Milorad Ristić (Darkwood Dub) - guitar, bass guitar, backing vocals
Drago Senić (Qrve) - vocals, bass guitar, backing vocals
Goran Simić (Revolt) - drums
Svetlana Spajić (Paganke, Moba, Drina) - vocals, backing vocals
Marina Stojković - ison
Predrag Stojković - kaval
Milan Tica (Revolt) - guitar
Petar Toplaović (Revolt) - vocals
Goran Trajkovski (Anastasia) - producer (track #13)
Miloš Velimir (Pussycat, Sunshine, Električni Orgazam, 357, Partibrejkers) - drums
Zora Vitas - vocals
Dejan Vučetić (Darkwood Dub) - vocals, programming
Veljko Vućurović (DST) - backing vocals
Bojan Vulin (Nesalomivi) - guitar

Additional personnel
Oliver Jovanović - postproduction
Marinko Lugonja - design
Uroš Marković - assisting recording
Goranka Matić - photography
Bjanka Paunović - assisting recording

Legacy
In 2021 Pesme iznad istoka i zapada was polled 69th on the list of 100 Best Serbian Albums Since the Breakup of SFR Yugoslavia. The list was published in the book Kako (ni)je propao rokenrol u Srbiji (How Rock 'n' Roll in Serbia (Didn't) Came to an End).

References

External links
Project official page

2001 compilation albums
Alternative rock albums by Serbian artists
Garage rock albums by Serbian artists
Pop rock albums by Serbian artists
Electronic albums by Serbian artists
Christian rock compilation albums
PGP-RTS compilation albums